Sophie Ley (1849–1918) was a German painter.

Ley was born in 1849 in Bodmann am Bodensee, Germany.

She also studied with Eugen Bracht at the Academy of Fine Arts, Karlsruhe. Ley exhibited her work at the Woman's Building at the 1893 World's Columbian Exposition in Chicago, Illinois.

Ley died in 1918 in Karlsruhe.

References

External links
 

1849 births
1918 deaths
German women painters
19th-century German women artists
20th-century German women artists
19th-century German painters
20th-century German painters